The Militia Group is an independent record company based in Long Beach, California.

History
The Militia Group was founded in 1998 by Chad Pearson as a booking agency, booking for artists such as Slick Shoes, Craig's Brother, Dogwood, twothirtyeight, Acceptance, and Element 101. Pearson and Rory Felton partnered in 2000 to turn the booking agency into a record company. Both Pearson and Felton had previous experience with independent labels and artists: Pearson in Seattle, WA working at Tooth & Nail Records, and Felton in Kansas City co-operating Arise Records with Jason Irvine in Louisville, KY. Arise published The Juliana Theory's first CD, a split album with Dawson High; and other bands: Tijuana Crime Scene, The National Acrobat, Reflector and Recess Theory. In 2000, Pearson teamed up with Felton to turn the agency into an independent record label based out of Huntington Beach, CA. By January 2001, the label had signed Rufio, The Lyndsay Diaries, Tora! Tora! Torrance!, Veronica, and Noise Ratchet. Within the next year Copeland, The Rocket Summer, The Beautiful Mistake, and Acceptance joined the fold.

By 2002, the label had sold its first 100,000 albums with its first release: Rufio's Perhaps, I Suppose..., and was operating out of offices in Anaheim, CA. By 2004, as the label  moved operations from Anaheim, CA to Garden Grove, CA. In early 2007, Pearson left TMG to start a company called P Is for Panda.  2007 saw albums released by Denison Witmer, The New Frontiers, Chase Pagan, and We Shot The Moon.  By 2008, the label had sold over 1,400,000 albums.

The label may be best known for developing the artist Cartel, for whom The Militia Group released The Ransom EP and Chroma.  The 'Chroma' title has sold over 1,030,000 singles, 255,000 albums (according to Soundscan) and was acquired by Sony Music's Epic Records.

The Militia Group stopped releasing new music in 2012, though its back catalogue is still in print.

Distribution
Distribution is handled on a territory by territory basis by:

United States: The Orchard

Roster

Current artists
 Backseat Goodbye
 Chase Pagan
 Denison Witmer
 Driving East
 Jill Cunniff 
 Jonathan Jones
 Lakes
 Let Go
 Mercy Mercedes
 Mobile 
 One for the Team
 The Panic Division
 Sights and Sounds
 Tahiti 80
 The Urgency

Former artists
 Acceptance (Active, currently on Rise Records)
 The Appleseed Cast
 Anadivine
 The Beautiful Mistake (Active, currently on Wiretap Records)
 Big Collapse
 Blueprint Car Crash
 Brandtson (Disbanded 2008)
 Cartel (Active, currently on Wind-up Records)
 The Class of 98 (Active, currently without a label)
 Controlling the Famous (Disbanded 2007)
 Copeland (Disbanded 2010, reunited 2014)
 Everybody Else
 Fielding
 The Jealous Sound (Active, currently on Rise Records)
 Juliette and the Licks (Disbanded 2009)
 The Holy Fire (Active)
 The Lyndsay Diaries
 Lovedrug 
 Man Alive (Active, currently on B& Recordings)
 Noise Ratchet
 The New Frontiers (Inactive)
 Quietdrive
 The Rocket Summer (Active, currently with Aviate Records)
 Reeve Oliver (Active, currently on Apple Danish Records)
 Ronnie Day (Active, currently on Simplify Music)
 Rufio 
 The Summer Set (Active, currently on Fearless Records)
 Tora! Tora! Torrance!
 Umbrellas (Active, currently without a label)
 Veronica
 We Shot the Moon (Active, currently on Afternoon Records)

References

 Rory Felton Interview
 Chad Pearson Interview

External links
 Official site

American independent record labels
Record labels established in 1998
Alternative rock record labels